Andi Hasa (born 26 August 1990) is an Albanian footballer who most recently played as a midfielder for Dinamo Tirana in the Albanian Superliga.

References

1990 births
Living people
Albanian footballers
Association football midfielders
KF Skrapari players
FK Dinamo Tirana players
Kategoria e Parë players